The  is a unit of the Japan Air Self-Defense Force based at Misawa Air Base in Aomori Prefecture. Under the authority of the Northern Air Defense Force, the flight operates Kawasaki T-4 aircraft.

References

Units of the Japan Air Self-Defense Force